Jack Welch (1905 in Cleburne, Texas – 1985) was an American illustrator known for his drawings and gouache paintings of droll family activities and his cover illustrations for The Saturday Evening Post. He was a member of the Society of Illustrators.

References
Quick Facts and Keywords for Jack Welch at AskART

1905 births
1985 deaths
People from Cleburne, Texas
American illustrators
Artists from Texas